The National Folklore Board is a statutory body with the primary aim to protect and promote folklore of Ghana.Folklore in Ghana is defined as set of traditional beliefs and customs of a community that may be preserved by an ethnic group or unidentified Ghanaian author.

History 
National Folklore Board is under the Ministry of Tourism, Arts and Culture as a state agency. The National Folklore Board, is the statutory body established and mandated under the Copyright Act, 2005 (Act 690) (the “Act”), to administer, register, promote and protect Ghanaian expressions of folklore on behalf of the President and for the people of Ghana. The Board which consists of National Folklore Board, Chairperson, Copyright administrator, nominated individual by national commission on culture and six other persons. Folklore is based on oral tradition, passed on from generation to generation which encompasses intellectual and spiritual  tradition. It is composed of customs, arts (dramatic ),festivals, musical stories, proverbs celebrated over the years.

The National Folklore Board has partnered with MTN to digitize Ghanaian folklore.

Functions 
National Folklore Board functions as a state agency, to perform the role of intellectual property and folklore branding in Ghana.

 To educate Ghanaians on folklore
 To preserve Ghana's rich heritage to influence nation building
 To boost domestic and international tourism to generate revenue and create jobs 
 Monthly outdoor activities "Did you know" throughout the year

Activities 

 Folklore Clubs
 Cultural Tourism
 National Traditional Games Competition
 Know your folklore campaign

References 

Society of Ghana